Nyla A. Murphy (January 31, 1931 – June 6, 2015) was an American lawyer, real estate broker, flight attendant, and politician. A Republican, she served in the Wyoming House of Representatives for 12 years from 1979 to 1991. She lived in Casper, Wyoming and represented Natrona County.

Born in Stilesville, Indiana, Murphy worked as a flight attendant. She met her husband C. J. Murphy and moved to Wyoming. She attended Butler University. Murphy received her bachelor's degree in political science from University of Wyoming and her law degree from University of Wyoming College of Law in 1993. Murphy was a real estate broker in Casper, Wyoming and then practiced law in Riverton, Wyoming and Laramie, Wyoming. Murphy served in the Wyoming House of Representatives for twelve years and was a Republican. She died from bile duct cancer at Ivinson Memorial Hospital in Laramie, Wyoming on June 6, 2015.

References

1931 births
2015 deaths
Deaths from cancer in Wyoming
Deaths from cholangiocarcinoma
People from Hendricks County, Indiana
Butler University alumni
University of Wyoming alumni
University of Wyoming College of Law alumni
Flight attendants
Businesspeople from Wyoming
Wyoming lawyers
Women state legislators in Wyoming
Republican Party members of the Wyoming House of Representatives
20th-century American women
People from Laramie, Wyoming
People from Casper, Wyoming
People from Riverton, Wyoming
20th-century American businesspeople
20th-century American lawyers
21st-century American women